Grupul Special de Protecţie şi Intervenţie (GSPI) is the police tactical unit of the Romanian General Directorate for Internal Security (DGPI) part of the Ministry of Internal Affairs. The designated nickname of the unit is Acvila, which is Romanian for "Eagle".

History
GSPI was established in January 2003 to satisfy the European Union requirements regarding counter-terrorist operations and internal protection following the Moscow theater hostage crisis in October 2002 and reported to the Ministry of Interior and Administrative Reform. Two Romanian police officers had conducted a study tour of EU countries police tactical units prior to the formation and significant assistance was provided from Germany's GSG 9 with the creation and development of GSPI. 

In 2007, GSPI joined the European Union ATLAS Network with other EU countries national police tactical units. In March 2009, GSPI was disbanded after a corruption scandal. 

In 2015, GSPI was re-established as part of the Directorate of Intelligence and Internal Security, later renamed to General Directorate for Internal Security.

Structure
GSPI structure is similar to GSG9 with a Combat group, Sniper team and Protection team.

Selection
Pre-selection lasts 10-14 days, and selection usually lasts between 30 and 45 days. At the end of these two first trials, only 15% of applicants are validated.   After that, a final exam follows, and if the candidate passes, he is now a member of the team. Three to five more years will then be dedicated for him to fully qualify in all the skills needed to become an operational member, during which he is trained in climbing and descending, parachuting, diving, explosives, first aid, instinctive shooting, aggressive car driving, VIP protection, and other disciplines.

References

External links
Unofficial GSPI page

Ministry of Administration and Interior (Romania)
Special forces of Romania
ATLAS Network